Herbert Stanley Allen FRSE FRS (29 December 1873 – 27 April 1954) was a Cornish physicist noted as a pioneer in early X-ray research, working under J. J. Thomson at the University of London and alongside Nobel laureate Charles Glover Barkla at the University of Edinburgh.  A supporter of the Parson magneton, Allen was also an early contributor to the field of quantum mechanics.

Biography
Allen was born in Bodmin in Cornwall, the son of Rev Richard Allen, a Wesleyan Methodist Minister. He attended John Wesley's School in Bath, Somerset.

As an undergraduate at Trinity College, Cambridge, Allen shared Whewell's Court with fellow pupil Edmund Whittaker, earning his Mathematics B.A. there in 1896.  After working at Cavendish Laboratory, Allen returned to Cambridge in 1898 to conduct research under J. J. Thomson on the motion of spheres through viscous fluids, useful in the determination of the elementary unit of charge.  In 1900 he moved to Renfrew, where he researched spectral photography, the Zeeman effect, and radioactivity under Lord Blythwood.  He was appointed lecturer in 1905 at King's College London where he obtained a D.Sc. in 1909 for his work on the discharge of electricity through gases.  He conducted this work under Harold A. Wilson and contemporary Charles Glover Barkla, whom he followed to the University of Edinburgh in 1919.

Allen's 1913 book, "Photo-electricity", was an early contribution to the study of radiation, focusing on his earlier work in photoelectric fatigue.  He then wrote a series of papers concerned with structure of the atom based on its magnetic and spectral properties. Beginning in 1919, he contributed a series of articles favoring a modified version of the Parson magneton, a physical model for the electron originally proposed in 1915 Quantum theory was then in its infancy and Allen's contributions were among the earliest to the subject.

Fellow academic Sir D’Arcy Thompson said of him, "Perhaps he does not realize how strongly he has endeared himself to his colleagues and his students by his own personality, his faith and vision…"  Allen died 27 April 1954 at the home of his daughter in Balblair, Ross-shire, Scotland.

Bibliography

1873 births
1954 deaths
People from Bodmin
English physicists
Particle physicists
Quantum physicists
Alumni of Trinity College, Cambridge
Academics of King's College London
Academics of the University of Edinburgh
Academics of the University of St Andrews
Fellows of the Royal Society of Edinburgh
Fellows of the Royal Society
Theoretical physicists